Øre is the centesimal subdivision of the Norwegian and Danish krones.

Øre may also refer to:
 Øre, Norway, a former municipality in Møre og Romsdal county, Norway
 Øre (lake), a lake in Åseral municipality, Vest-Agder county, Norway
 Øre, an area in northern Rygge municipality, and southeastern Moss, Norway
 Henrik Øre (born 1979), former Danish cricketer

See also
 Ore (disambiguation)
Öre, the centesimal subdivision of the Swedish krona